D'elles (meaning About Them or From Them) is a thirteenth French-language and twenty-second studio album by Canadian singer Celine Dion, released by Columbia Records on 18 May 2007. It is a concept album which features thirteen songs written by influential female authors from France and Quebec, including: Françoise Dorin, Christine Orban, Nina Bouraoui, Marie Laberge, Lise Payette, Denise Bombardier, Nathalie Nechtschein, Jovette Alice Bernier, Janette Bertrand and George Sand. The themes throughout this album centre on "woman"; the album's title is a play on the title of her earlier album D'eux, replacing the third person plural masculine or neutral pronoun eux with the feminine elles.

The first single, "Et s'il n'en restait qu'une (je serais celle-là)" reached number one in France and number two in Quebec. It was followed by another Quebec top ten single, "Immensité".

D'elles received favorable reviews from music critics, some of whom noticed that it is Dion's most ambitious project in a long time. On the commercial level, the album debuted at number one in Canada and France, and also topped the chart in Belgium Wallonia and reached number three in Switzerland. It was certified two times platinum in Canada, platinum in France, and gold in Belgium and Switzerland.

Background
On 14 September 2006, celinedion.com posted information that Dion would release a new French album in 2007. Ten prominent female writers from Quebec and France wrote the lyrics and a team of famous French composers worked on the music. Jean-Jacques Goldman would be overseeing the album which will be recorded in Las Vegas. On 3 January 2007, Dion's official website announced that the new French-language album, D'elles was scheduled for release in May 2007. The title is a spin-off of Dion's 1995 album D'eux. Both can be translated as About Them or From Them, with D'elles being specifically the feminine version. In a press release from 12 January 2007, it was confirmed that Dion is still working on her upcoming album which is a concept project. The lyrics were written by females only: Françoise Dorin, Christine Orban, Nina Bouraoui, Marie Laberge, Lise Payette, Denise Bombardier, Nathalie Nechtschein, Janette Bertrand, Jovette Alice Bernier and George Sand, and the themes throughout this album centre on "woman". Many of Dion's long-time collaborators, including Jean-Jacques Goldman, participated in this project. Although Goldman did not write any of the songs, he supervised the album and arranged the song lyrics. Music composers included: Erick Benzi, Jacques Veneruso, David Gategno and Gildas Arzel.

The first single "Et s'il n'en restait qu'une (je serais celle-là)", written by Françoise Dorin and David Gategno, was scheduled for release in Francophone countries on 14 February 2007. Dion's official website posted information that D'elles will be released in two special editions: a double digipak and a collectors box set. The album was scheduled for release on 21 May 2007 in selected European countries and 22 May 2007 in Canada. "Et s'il n'en restait qu'une (je serais celle-là)" premiered on 14 February 2007 and was sent to radio and released as a digital download on the same day. In a press release from 16 February 2007, celinedion.com announced that Dion is putting the finishing touches on D'elles, an album which celebrates womanhood. Also two new music composers were added to the list: Marc Dupré and Jean-François Breau. The first excerpt from the "Et s'il n'en restait qu'une (je serais celle-là)"  music video was posted on 28 March 2007 and the full video premiered on 4 April 2007. The "Et s'il n'en restait qu'une (je serais celle-là)" CD single was issued on 13 April 2007 in Francophone countries. The cover art for the album, by Daniela Federici, was released on 19 April 2007.

Content
On 17 April 2007, the complete track listing for the album containing thirteen songs became available for TeamCeline members. D'elles includes two versions of the song "A cause". While the lyrics, written by Françoise Dorin, are the same on both versions, there are two different musical arrangements. The music for the first version, titled "A cause", was composed by Jacques Veneruso, and the music for the second version, titled  "On s'est aimé à cause", was composed by Marc Dupré and Jean-François Breau. Dorin also wrote the first single, "Et s'il n'en restait qu'une (je serais celle-là)". She is a French writer, songwriter and actress. D'elles also includes "Immensité", the second single which was sent to radio on 27 April 2007. It was written by Nina Bouraoui, a French-Algerian author whose work focuses mainly on the bond between females. She also wrote "Les paradis".

Other songs include: "Je cherche l'ombre" with lyrics by Lise Payette who is a well-known Quebec author, an avid writer and a weekly columnist for Le Journal de Montréal, a television and radio personality, a politician and a strong advocate for women; "La diva", a tribute to the famous opera singer Maria Callas, written by Denise Bombardier, an established journalist, novelist and media personality in Quebec who was honoured with the prestigious Legion of Honour and the National Order of Quebec (the song includes fragment of "Sì. Mi Chiamano Mimì" from the opera La bohème performed by Callas); "Femme comme chacune" whose lyrics are an adaptation of the poem "Ses yeux de clair de lune", by the late Quebec author, Jovette Alice Bernier; "Si j'étais quelqu'un" which is a reflection on what society judges as being "normal" and whose lyrics are adapted from a poem written by Nathalie Nechtschein, a young French poet; "Je ne suis pas celle" written by Christine Orban, a Moroccan-French novelist who has authored many books an describes herself as a romantic who treasures the female's ability to dream; "Le temps qui compte" with lyrics by Marie Laberge, a Quebec author known in Canada for her literature, and in other Francophone countries for her plays; "Lettre de George Sand à Alfred de Musset", an adaptation of a letter exchanged between two lovers in the 19th century, written by George Sand; and "Berceuse", a lullaby written for Dion's son René-Charles by Janette Bertrand, a famous writer and public personality in Quebec, winner of the 1990 Montreal Salon de la Femme 'Femme du Siècle' award.

D'elles was released in three versions: standard edition in jewel case, a special edition in double digipak (including DVD, a booklet of Dion's photos, and another booklet with song lyrics and Dion's personal notes about each track) and a second special edition in collectors box set (with DVD, a mini-booklet of Dion's photos and her personal notes about each song, a mini-booklet with song lyrics, and four postcards). The bonus DVD, titled Céline parle D'elle(s) includes the making of the album in a recording studio, behind-the-scenes from the "Et s'il n'en restait qu'une (je serais celle-là)" music video and photo shoot for the album.

Promotion
For the release of her new French-language album, Dion taped a two-hour television special about D'elles which was broadcast on 21 May 2007 on TVA in Canada. It was hosted by Quebec television icon Julie Snyder and featured Dion and the female authors who wrote the song lyrics for the album. Dion performed: "Et s'il n'en restait qu'une (je serais celle-là)", "Immensité", "Je cherche l'ombre", "Berceuse", "La diva", "Le temps qui compte" and "On s'est aimé à cause". The recording sessions for "Femme comme chacune", "Lettre de George Sand à Alfred de Musset" and "Si J'étais quelqu'un" were also shown. The television special was watched by 1,614,000 viewers and became the number-one-rated show for the week of 21 to 27 May with 82% share of the audience.

On 9 June 2007, another television special was broadcast, this time in France on TF1. Dion was interviewed and performed three songs from D'elles ("Et s'il n'en restait qu'une (je serais celle-là)", "A cause" and "Immensité") and also many duets: "Stayin' Alive" with Vitaa, Shy'm and Amel Bent, "Hymne à l'amour" with Maurane and Johnny Hallyday, "Blueberry Hill" with Johnny Hallyday, "The Show Must Go On" with Christophe Maé and David Hallyday, "My Heart Will Go On" with Lââm and Amel Bent, "Caroline" with MC Solaar and Nolwenn Leroy, "Être à la hauteur" with Merwan Rim and Christophe Maé, and "Caruso" with Florent Pagny. This television special was watched by 4,987,440 viewers. At the end of the year, during Dion's promotional visit to France, she performed "Immensité" on various occasions: on 2 November 2007 on Star Academy as a duet with one of the contestants; on 5 November 2007 during the Chérie FM Awards ceremony which wasn't broadcast on television; on 10 November 2007 on Hit Machine on M6; and on 29 December 2007 on Les Stars de L'année on France 2.

Dion performed "Et s'il n'en restait qu'une (je serais celle-là)" in French-speaking territories during her Taking Chances World Tour, which means the album was only supported by one song. According to the tourbook, "Immensité" was rehearsed but never performed during the tour, though it was performed in later tours.

Singles
The first single, "Et s'il n'en restait qu'une (je serais celle-là)" was released as a digital download in Francophone countries on 14 February 2007. However, the singles charts in these countries did not include digital sales at that time, so "Et s'il n'en restait qu'une (je serais celle-là)" entered them only thanks to the CD single which was issued two months later, on 13 April 2007. The song debuted at number one in France, becoming Dion's fifth chart-topping single in this country. It also peaked at number four in Belgium Wallonia and number thirty-four in Switzerland. Because of these positions, the single reached number seven on the European Hot 100 Singles. In Quebec, "Et s'il n'en restait qu'une (je serais celle-là)" peaked at number two.

The second single, "Immensité" was released as a digital download in Francophone countries on 14 May 2007, and the music video premiered on 22 May 2007. Again, the digital sales did not count towards singles charts in these countries. Therefore, "Immensité" did not enter the sales charts but it peaked inside top ten on the Top 100 Francophone Radio BDS in Quebec.

In Poland, "Le temps qui compte" was released as the first and only single on 18 May 2007. The song promoted the album on radio and reacher no. 1 on RMF FM on 11 June 2007.

"On s'est aimé à cause" started receiving airplay in Quebec in August 2007. In France, Sony Music Entertainment created in January 2008 promotional singles of "A cause" with a Dance Remix. However, in February 2008 it was reported that Sony is considering the release of "Le temps qui compte" instead of "A cause". Eventually, Sony did not support any of these releases.

Critical reception

D'elles received positive reviews from music critics. According to Stephen Thomas Erlewine from AllMusic, "it is Dion's most ambitious project in a long time, if not ever. The only rival is musically adventurous 1 fille & 4 types, and if D'elles is a bit too careful musically, it nevertheless is unified as an album and shows some serious artistic ambition. Sonically, D'elles couldn't be more different than the folky 1 fille & 4 types, from its "soaring majestic ballads" to its 'chilly disco sheen.'" Erlewine called the album extremely European.

A Los Angeles Times article stated, "Although critics complain about Dion's weakness for meaningless bombast, bombast is in fact the only meaning Dion has to offer. Like recent work by Madonna or Barbra Streisand, this music is about power. In every song, Dion allows the arena-schmaltz atmospherics to threaten her center-stage dominance. Then, just in time, she beats back the violins with a trademark shriek".

Commercial reception
In Canada, D'elles shot to the top of the chart, selling 72,200 copies in its first week and making it the biggest debut of the year, according to data compiled by Nielsen SoundScan. It marked her tenth number-one album in the SoundScan era, and her eighth to debut at the top position. Out of 72,200 units, 69,285 were sold in Quebec alone. Dion captured the top spot once again next week, selling 24,158 copies. In the third week, D'elles slipped to number three selling 11,000 units and on 12 June 2007, it was certified 2× platinum in Canada for shipping 200,000 copies. In the fourth week, the album sank to number eight. D'elles also spent two weeks at number one on the Quebec Albums Chart.

In France, D'elles also debuted at number one, selling 55,244 copies. It stayed at the top position for the second week, selling 44,143 units. In the third week, it dropped to number two with sales of 18,040 units. The next week, D'elles fell to number four selling another 17,800 copies and on 21 June 2007, it was certified platinum for shipping 200,000 units. Till the end of 2007, the album has sold 259,700 physical copies in France. As of September 2010, the album has sold over 300,000 copies in France.

In Belgium Wallonia, D'elles has sold 15,000 units on the first day after and was certified gold immediately. It reached number one and stayed there for three consecutive weeks. In Switzerland, the album peaked at number three and was certified gold. D'elles has shipped half a million units worldwide during the first week of sales.

Accolades

In July 2007, Dion was nominated for three Chérie FM Awards: Album of the Year, French Song of the Year ("Et s'il n'en restait qu'une (je serais celle-là)") and Female Artist of the Year. Additionally she received Honorary Award during the ceremony. Later, in December 2007, she was also nominated for NRJ Music Award as Francophone Female Artist of the Year and she won Honorary Award during the ceremony. At the Juno Awards of 2008, Dion received six nominations, including two exclusively for D'elles: Album of the Year and Francophone Album of the Year.

Track listing

Personnel

Michel Aimé – guitars
Carla Antoun – cello
Gildas Arzel – arranger, guitars, bass
Christophe Battaglia – engineer
Erick Benzi – producer, arranger, engineer, programming, piano, synthesizers, background vocals
Thierry Blanchard – producer, engineer, programming, keyboards
Hubert Bougis – orchestrator
Cécile Brillard – viola
Nathalie Carlucci – viola
Herve Cavelier – violin
Terry Chiazza – project coordinator
Caroline Collombel-Damas – violin
Laurent Coppola – drums
Chistopher Deschamps – drums
Dominic Despins – engineer
Delphine Elbe – background vocals
Sandrine François – background vocals
David Gategno – producer, arranger, programming, keyboards, voice intro
Humberto Gatica – engineer, mix
Emmanuel Guerrero – piano, strings arranger
Cyril Guignier – viola
Patrick Hampartzoumian – producer, arranger, engineer, programming
Jean Marc Haroutounian – bass
Florence Hennequin – cello
Tino Izzo – producer, arranger, engineer, programming, piano, keyboards, guitars, bass, percussion  
Adam Klemens – orchestra director
Cenda Kotzmann – engineer's assistant
François-Éric Lalonde – engineer's assistant
Caroline Lasfargues – violin
Vincent Lépée – assistant's engineer
Stéphane Lévy-B – engineer, mix
Claire Lisiecki – violin
Didier Lizé – engineer
Gildas Lointier – arranger, engineer
Vito Luprano – executive producer
Vlado Meller – mastering
Vanessa Menneret – viola
Simon Mercure – engineer's assistant
Nicolas Yvan Mingot – guitar
George Pelekoudis – engineer
Orchestre Philharmonique de Prague – orchestra
Paris Pop Orchestra – orchestra
Petr Pycha – orchestra contractor
Stanislas Renoult – strings conductor, strings director and arranger
Zizou Sadki – bass
Constance Schacher – viola
Mario Telaro – drums
Jacques Veneruso – producer, arranger, guitars, background vocals
Florence Veniant – violin
Laurent Vernerey – bass

Charts

Weekly charts

Year-end charts

All-time charts

Certifications and sales

Release history

See also
List of number-one albums of 2007 (Canada)
List of number-one singles of 2007 (France)

References

External links
 

2007 albums
Albums produced by Erick Benzi
Celine Dion albums
Concept albums
French-language albums